Sapphire Princess is a cruise ship owned by Princess Cruises that entered service in 2004 as the sister ship of . At the time she was one of the world's largest cruise ships, with a capacity of 2,670 passengers  and is the second Gem-class ship built by Princess Cruises. Sapphire Princess was christened on 10 June 2004, in Seattle—the first cruise ship ever to be christened in that port.

Design and construction

Sapphire Princess was built in Japan by Mitsubishi Heavy Industries, the second Princess Cruises ship to be built in a Japanese shipyard. She and her sister ship were the largest cruise ships to be built by Mitsubishi since the Crystal Harmony in 1991.

The name swap occurred because a major fire swept through the original Diamond Princess (presently sailing as today's Sapphire Princess) during construction, leading to a construction delay. Both sister ships were being constructed at the same time, so the original Sapphire assumed the role of Diamond. This name swap assisted in keeping the delivery date of Diamond Princess on time, and kept Sapphire Princess on schedule as it was nearing completion early. Due to the fire and name swap, she would be the last Carnival Corporation & plc vessel built by Mitsubishi until the completion of AIDAprima in 2016.

Machinery
Her diesel-electric plant includes four diesel generators and a gas turbine generator. The diesel generators are Wärtsilä 46 series common rail engines, two of the straight 9-cylinder configuration, and two of the straight 8-cylinder configuration.  The 8- and 9-cylinder engines can produce approximately 8 and 9 MW of power respectively.  These engines are fueled with heavy fuel oil (HFO or bunker c) and Marine Gas Oil (MGO) depending on the local regulations regarding emissions, as MGO produces much lower emissions but is much more expensive. The gas turbine generator is a GE 2500, producing a peak of 25 MW of power and being fueled by MGO.  This generator is much more expensive to run than the diesel generators, and is used mostly in areas, such as Alaska, where the emissions regulations are strict. It is also used when top speed is required to make it to a port in a short time period. There are two propulsion electric motors which drive fixed-pitch propellers and six thrusters used during maneuvering; three bow and three stern.  The propulsion electric motors (PEMs), are conventional synchronous motors made by Alstom Motors, driven by synchroconverters made by Alstom Power Conversion (now GE Power Conversion).  The two motors are each rated to 20 MW and have a maximum speed of 154 rpm. (Rated speed of 0-145 rpm.)

Areas of operation

Sapphire Princess previously sailed on the west coast of the United States but in 2014 the ship undertook Asian cruises from Shanghai in the summer months and in the winter cruises out of Singapore. After her Singapore season concluded in 2016, the ship sailed from China year-round until 2017. The winter sailings from Singapore resumed during the 2017–18 season.

On 28 March 2018 she re-positioned to Southampton, UK with a 38-day cruise where she was based until 21 October 2018 when she returned to Singapore with another 38 day cruise. Sapphire Princess will again in 2019 re-position to Southampton for the northern summer before returning to Singapore later in 2019. She will be homeported in Singapore for 2020. Following her summer season in Asia, Sapphire Princess will be based in Melbourne in October 2020 for Australia and New Zealand sailings.

Following the outbreak of SARS-CoV-2, Sapphire Princess will be deployed to Australia six months early.

Incidents and accidents

Whale strikes
On two occasions, whales have been found dead on the bulbous bow of Sapphire Princess, a year apart from each other. On 25 July 2009, the ship docked at Canada Place Terminal, in Vancouver, British Columbia, Canada, with a dead fin whale lodged on its bow.  The estimated  whale was found on top of the bulbous bow.  Preliminary reports from the Fisheries and Oceans necropsy suggest the whale might have been sick.

On 28 July 2010, Sapphire Princess had a whale stuck on the bow of the ship. The estimated  humpback whale became entangled on the ship's bulbous bow while Sapphire Princess was sailing from Ketchikan to Juneau.

Drownings

In 2014, a 29-year old woman drowned in a pool aboard Sapphire Princess. 

In 2015, another passenger also drowned in the Neptune pool aboard Sapphire Princess.

In Manila by COVID-19 pandemic
 Sapphire Princess was anchored in Manila because of the OFWs and passengers from the Philippines and it was one of the 10 ships in Manila.

References

External links

 Princess Cruises website

Ships of Princess Cruises
Passenger ships of Bermuda
Ships built by Mitsubishi Heavy Industries